John Wrathall is a former football (soccer) player who represented New Zealand at international level.

Wrathall played two official A-international matches for the New Zealand in 1960, both against Pacific minnows Tahiti, the first a 5–1 win on 5 September, the second a 2–1 win on 12 September 1960.

Wrathall had a very long career in senior football, playing for over 25 years, and recorded his 1000th goal playing for Eastern Suburbs against Mount Albert-Ponsonby in the 1971 New Zealand National Soccer League.

References 

Year of birth missing (living people)
Living people
New Zealand association footballers
New Zealand international footballers
Association football forwards